Kiss Symphony: Alive IV is a 2003 live album from the American rock band, Kiss, performing with the Melbourne Symphony Orchestra (MSO). The arrangements were made by David Campbell, who also conducted the MSO. It is the group's fourth album in the Alive series and first release under Kiss Records and Sanctuary Records.

Album information
The concert from which the album is taken featured original Kiss members Peter Criss, Paul Stanley, and Gene Simmons. All three appeared at a press conference announcing the show. "The result will be no less than a symphonic sonic boom," promised Stanley. "Beethoven and Mozart will rise up dancing with fists raised as we unleash a spectacle that will be both classic and classical. This time it's black tie and black leather." Members of the Melbourne Symphony Orchestra who accompanied Kiss during this performance wore Kiss makeup and tuxedos.

Although Stanley said, "We're hoping Ace will be at this spectacular concert," guitarist Frehley once again left the band. The show instead introduced new member Tommy Thayer as the "Spaceman". The resultant album was Kiss's last to feature Criss – who would leave the band officially in 2004, to be replaced once again by Eric Singer. (Singer had previously rejoined the band to replace Criss in 2001 after the band's first Farewell Tour.)

In 2000, Kiss had planned to release the original Alive IV (featuring the reunited original lineup), but this was nixed by label politics and contracts. The artwork was revealed  and its version of "Rock and Roll All Nite" was added to The Box Set, but the album was shelved. The band moved labels from Universal/Island to Sanctuary Music and issued Kiss Symphony: Alive IV. The original Alive IV belatedly appeared – as Alive! The Millennium Concert – in a 2006 box set of all the Alive albums, Kiss Alive! 1975-2000.

10,000 limited numbered copies were released on vinyl in the US.

Unlike past Alive releases, the songs on the album appear in the order they were performed, with the concert split into three acts. In Act One, Kiss performed six songs by themselves. In Act Two, they performed a five-song acoustic set with the Melbourne Symphony Ensemble. Act Three featured the band and the full 60-piece orchestra on all tracks.

The live versions of "Rock and Roll All Nite", "God of Thunder" and "Lick It Up" were featured on the soundtrack of the video game Tony Hawk's Underground. The game also featured a bonus level, entitled "Hotter Than Hell", which takes place where the performance was done in Melbourne.

Track listing
All tracks were recorded at Marvel Stadium (known at the time as Telstra Dome) in Melbourne, Australia, on February 28, 2003.

2-disc edition

Disc 1

Disc 2

Single-Disc Edition

Personnel
Members
Paul Stanley – vocals, rhythm guitar
Gene Simmons – vocals, bass
Peter Criss – drums, vocals
Tommy Thayer – lead guitar, backing vocals

Additional personnel
The Melbourne Symphony Orchestra
Mark Opitz – producer
Tony Wall – engineer
David Campbell – composer

Charts

Certifications

References

2003 live albums
Kiss (band) live albums
Albums produced by Mike Opitz
Sequel albums
Melbourne Symphony Orchestra albums
Sanctuary Records live albums